Calosoma persianum is a species of ground beetle in the subfamily of Carabinae. It was described by Morvan in 1974.

References

persianum
Beetles described in 1974